The general election for mayor of Alexandria, Virginia, was held on November 3, 2015. Allison Silberberg defeated incumbent mayor Bill Euille, who was running as a write-in after being defeated by Silberberg in his attempt to seek renomination in the Democratic primary.

Democratic primary
The Democratic primary was held June 9, 2015. Vice-mayor Silberberg, a relative political newcomer, unseated longtime mayor Euille, and also defeated former mayor Donley, in what was regarded to be an upset victory.

General election

References

2015
2015 United States mayoral elections
2015 Virginia elections